Koenraad Francine Gaston "Koen" Dillen (born 6 November 1964) is a Belgian politician and a former Member of the European Parliament (MEP) for Flanders with the Vlaams Belang, sitting in the Identity, Tradition, Sovereignty group in the European Parliament. He is the son of Karel Dillen, founder of the Vlaams Blok.

He sat on its Committee on Development, and was a substitute for the Committee on Civil Liberties, Justice and Home Affairs and a member of the Delegation to the ACP-EU Joint Parliamentary Assembly.

Education
 1987: Degree in translation

Career
 1989–1990: French teacher
 1990–1992: Account manager, Rank Xerox
 1992–1994: Senior official, Belgian Parliament
 1994–2003: Civil servant
 since 2000: Municipal Councillor
 2003–2014: Member of the European Parliament

See also
 2004 European Parliament election in Belgium

External links

 

1964 births
Living people
Vlaams Belang MEPs
MEPs for Belgium 1999–2004
MEPs for Belgium 2004–2009
People from Mortsel